Tazehabad-e Fushazdeh (also Romanized as Tāzehābād-e Fūshāzdeh; also known as Tāzehābād) is a village in Dehshal Rural District, in the Central District of Astaneh-ye Ashrafiyeh County, Gilan Province, Iran. At the 2006 census, its population was 103, in 32 families.

References 

Populated places in Astaneh-ye Ashrafiyeh County